St Benedict's High School is a Roman Catholic High School in Linwood, Renfrewshire, in the west of Scotland.

The school
St Benedict's High School was formed by the amalgamation of St Cuthbert's High School in Johnstone and St Brendan's High School in Linwood. St Benedict's High School serves the Linwood, Houston, Bridge of Weir, Johnstone, Elderslie, Kilbarchan, Howwood and Lochwinnoch areas of Renfrewshire.
The school has five associated primary schools - Our Lady of Peace, St. Anthony's, St. David's, St. Fillan's and St. Margaret's. The school roll was 712 pupils as of September 2012. The school's motto is "Ora et Labora" which means ''"Pray and Work".

The building
The school building was built by Carillion (who had been commissioned to build several schools in the area) from January 2005 to July 2006, over a period of 79 weeks, for Amey, who lease the building to Renfrewshire Council. Amey also provide the janitorial and cleaning staff.

The school is laid out over two floors, with three main wings. These three wings are linked by a large, roughly rectangular social area, known as The Street, which houses the cafeteria, stage and main meeting area for pupils during breaks (Interval & Lunchtime). The Street also features underfloor heating, three vending machines, lockers, and watercoolers.

References

External links
 St Benedict's High School's page on Scottish Schools Online

Catholic secondary schools in Renfrewshire
Educational institutions established in 2006
2006 establishments in Scotland
Johnstone